The 2005 NCAA Division I Men's Tennis Championships were the 59th annual championships to determine the national champions of NCAA Division I men's singles, doubles, and team collegiate tennis in the United States.

UCLA defeated defending champions Baylor in the championship match, 4–3, to claim the Bruins' sixteenth team national title (and first since 1984).

Host sites
This year's tournaments were played at the George P. Mitchell Tennis Center at Texas A&M University in College Station, Texas. 

This was the final year that the men's and women's Division I tennis tournaments were held at separate sites; both would be held jointly at Stanford University in 2006.

See also
NCAA Division II Tennis Championships (Men, Women)
NCAA Division III Tennis Championships (Men, Women)

References

External links
List of NCAA Men's Tennis Champions

NCAA Division I tennis championships
NCAA Division I Men's Tennis Championships
NCAA Division I Men's Tennis Championships
NCAA Division I Men's Tennis Championships